"Second Hand Love" is a popular song written by Phil Spector and Hank Hunter and performed by American entertainer Connie Francis, reaching #7 on the Billboard Hot 100 in 1962.

Charts

References

1962 singles
1962 songs
Connie Francis songs
MGM Records singles
Songs written by Phil Spector